Several ships of the Royal Navy have borne the name HMS Doterel, after the wading bird more often spelled "dotterel":

, a  launched on 6 October 1808, hulked in 1827 and broken up in about 1855.
, the ex-Post Office wooden paddle packet Escape, purchased in 1837 and disposed of in 1850.
, a  launched on 5 July 1860 and sold to Marshall of Plymouth on 6 June 1871.
, a  sloop launched in 1880. She sank off the coast of Punta Arenas after an explosion on 26 April 1881 with the loss of 143 lives.
, a yacht requisitioned in 1918 subsequently renamed Dotter

Royal Navy ship names